Stenograpta is a monotypic moth genus of the family Erebidae. Its only species, Stenograpta stenoptera, is found in Japan. Both the genus and species were first described by Shigero Sugi in 1959.

References

Calpinae
Monotypic moth genera